Meydenbauer Bay Park (formerly Meydenbauer Beach Park) is a park located in Bellevue, Washington along Lake Washington. Named after William Meydenbauer, the park features paved and unpaved trails, picnic tables, a playground, a restroom facility and a beach.

History
Meydenbauer Bay Park was once the landing site for passenger ferries that ran between Seattle and Bellevue from the 1890s until 1921. The site was also once home to Wildwood Park, a dance hall and popular destination for Seattle residents.  In 1953, it became Bellevue's first park.

In 2009, the park was one of three that welcomed the Seattle Civic Christmas Ship. Previously known as Meydenbauer Beach Park, a grand reopening was held in March 2019 following a beach expansion and the addition of a curving 420-foot-long pedestrian pier.

Features

The park features paved and unpaved trails, landscaping with native plants, a restroom facility, a playground, picnic tables, a sand and gravel beach, and a fishing dock. Lifeguard duty is offered between late June and Labor Day.

References

External links

Map (PDF), City of Bellevue, Washington

1953 establishments in Washington (state)
Parks in Bellevue, Washington
Protected areas established in 1953
Urban public parks